Billy King Solomon (born November 16, 1944) is a retired Quartermaster officer, U.S. Army Lieutenant General and former Commander of the Combined Arms Support Command,  Fort Lee, Virginia.

Early life

Lieutenant General Solomon was born in Oakwood, Freestone County, Texas.  In 1966, he graduated from Prairie View A&M University with a BS Degree in Agriculture, and was commissioned a Second Lieutenant in the Quartermaster Corps through the Reserve Officer Training Corps Program.  He later went on to receive an MS Degree from the Florida Institute of Technology in contracting and acquisition management.

Military career

Other key assignments held during his career included:  Director, Logistics and Security Assistance, J4/J7, US Central Command, MacDill Air Force Base, Florida; Chief of Staff, US Army Materiel Command, Alexandria, Virginia; Assistant Chief of Staff, J4/C4/G4, US Forces Korea/United Nations Command/Combined Forces Command/Eighth US Army, Korea; Commander, 13th Corps Support Command, III Corps, Fort Hood, Texas; Commander, Joint Logistics Task Force, United Nations Operations, Somalia; and Commander, Division Support Command, 5th Infantry Division (United States) (Mechanized), Fort Polk, Louisiana.

Lieutenant General Solomon also served in a number of important key developmental assignments, which includes Platoon Leader and S-3 Officer, 266th Supply and Service Battalion, US Army, Vietnam; Assistant G-4, 2nd Armored Division (United States), Fort Hood, Texas; S-3 Officer, Logistics Support Activity, US Army, Vietnam; Commander, Headquarters Company, 88th Supply and Service Battalion, US Army, Vietnam; Supply and Logistics Officer with the 109th and 902nd Military Intelligence Groups, Fort Meade, Maryland; Chief Logistics Officer, US Army Communications Command Agency, Canal Zone, Fort Clayton, Panama; Personnel Management Officer, US Army Military Personnel Center, Alexandria, Virginia; Protocol Officer, Office of the Chief of Staff, Army, Washington, DC; Commander, 498th Support Battalion, 2nd Armored Division (Forward), US Army Europe and Seventh Army, Germany; and Chief, Quartermaster/Chemical Branch, later Chief, Combat Service Support Division, Enlisted Personnel Management Directorate, US Army Personnel Command, Alexandria, Virginia.

Lieutenant General Solomon retired on September 30, 2002, culminating 36 years of distinguished military Service as the Commanding General, US Army Combined Arms Support Command and Fort Lee, Fort Lee, Virginia.

His military education includes the Quartermaster Officers Basic and Advanced Courses, Armed Forces Staff College, Logistics Executive Development Course, and Industrial College of the Armed Forces.

Decorations and honors

 Defense Distinguished Service Medal with Oak Leaf Cluster
 Distinguished Service Medal (U.S. Army) with Oak Leaf Cluster
 Defense Superior Service Medal
 Legion of Merit with 2 Oak Leaf Clusters
 Bronze Star Medal with Oak Leaf Cluster
 Meritorious Service Medal with 3 Oak Leaf Clusters
 Army Commendation Medal with Oak Leaf Cluster
 Army Achievement Medal.

Lieutenant General Solomon is a Distinguished Member of the Quartermaster Regiment, a recipient of the Distinguished Order of Saint Martin and a member of the Quartermaster Hall of Fame.

Personal
Solomon is the son of Quincy Lee Solomon (February 12, 1918 – August 14, 1982) and Jeweline Ricks Solomon. He had three sisters.

Solomon is married to Cathyrn Solomon. They moved to Gainesville, Virginia after his retirement.

Solomon has two children and two grandchildren: (Daughter) Tonya Solomon and (Son) Brandon King Solomon.

References

 Hall of Fame Biography, Quartermaster Regimental Honors Program, June 18, 2010, Quartermaster School, Fort Lee, Virginia.

1944 births
Living people
People from Fairfield, Texas
People from Oakwood, Texas
Prairie View A&M University alumni
African-American United States Army personnel
Quartermasters
United States Army personnel of the Vietnam War
Florida Institute of Technology alumni
Joint Forces Staff College alumni
Dwight D. Eisenhower School for National Security and Resource Strategy alumni
Recipients of the Legion of Merit
United States Army generals
Recipients of the Defense Superior Service Medal
Recipients of the Distinguished Service Medal (US Army)
Recipients of the Defense Distinguished Service Medal
People from Gainesville, Virginia
Military personnel from Texas
African Americans in the Vietnam War
20th-century African-American people